Barsoi Junction railway station serves Barsoi city in Katihar district in the Indian state of Bihar. It is a major and very important railway station having stoppages of premium trains like Howrah–New Jalpaiguri Vande Bharat Express and New Jalpaiguri–Howrah Shatabdi Express.

History
Assam Behar State Railway extended the -wide metre-gauge railway from Parbatipur, now in Bangladesh, to Katihar in 1889. The connection was truncated with the partition of India in 1947, and the line now runs up to Radhikapur, near the Bangladesh border.

In 1948–50, as a part of the Assam Rail Link project, the Fakiragram–Kishanganj sector was connected to the North Eastern Railway network at Barsoi. The railway lines in the area started being converted to  broad gauge from the early 1960s.

Amenities
Barsoi railway station has a four-bedded retiring room.

References

External links

Railway stations in Katihar district
Katihar railway division
Railway junction stations in Bihar
Railway stations in India opened in 1889
1889 establishments in British India